Mucilaginibacter gossypiicola is a Gram-negative, non-motile and plant-growth-promoting bacterium from the genus of Mucilaginibacter which has been isolated from rhizosphere soil from cotton plants.

References

External links
Type strain of Mucilaginibacter gossypiicola at BacDive -  the Bacterial Diversity Metadatabase

Sphingobacteriia
Bacteria described in 2010